BBC2 Playhouse is a UK anthology television series of one-hour episodes produced by the British Broadcasting Corporation (BBC). Among its many performers were Helen Mirren, Daniel Day-Lewis, Judi Dench, Liam Neeson, Paul Scofield, Deborah Kerr, Ben Kingsley, Donald Pleasence, Brenda Blethyn, Peggy Ashcroft and Margaret Whiting.

It premiered in the UK on 13 March 1974 and ran until 20 May 1983.

Productions
This table is based on records in the BBC Genome archive of the Radio Times and the BFI database.

See also
Other BBC2 drama anthology series include
 Theatre 625
 Thirty-Minute Theatre
 Screen Two
 Second City Firsts

References

External links

1970s British anthology television series
1980s British anthology television series
British drama television series
1974 British television series debuts
1983 British television series endings
1970s British drama television series
1980s British drama television series